The Merthyr state by-election, 1989 was a by-election held on 13 May 1989 for the Queensland Legislative Assembly seat of Merthyr, based in the inner Brisbane suburb of New Farm.

The by-election was triggered by the resignation of National MP and former minister Don Lane on 20 January 1989. Lane, who had been a member of the Liberal Party until shortly after the 1983 election, had admitted that he had misappropriated funds during his time as a minister in Sir Joh Bjelke-Petersen's government, which was being investigated by the Fitzgerald Inquiry. Furthermore, he implicated 14 other serving or former ministers in these activities. The media, led by The Courier-Mail newspaper, questioned the morality of a confessed dishonest politician continuing a Parliamentary career at the expense of taxpayers. Upon his resignation, despite the Labor Party's opposition to any further entitlements, he collected a superannuation payout of A$535,000 and awaited charges from the inquiry's special prosecutor, Doug Drummond QC.

The by-election campaign was quite unusual, with a total of 10 candidates nominating. A local car salesperson, Betty Byrne-Henderson, won National Party preselection and campaigned on the slogan "Send a Message to Canberra". However, most of the campaign's attention was on Queensland issues—in particular the daily revelations from the Fitzgerald Inquiry.

Candidates
The candidates were:
 Santo Santoro of the Liberal Party;
 Barbara Dawson of the Labor Party;
 Betty Byrne-Henderson, a car salesperson representing the National Party;
 John Brown of the Australian Democrats;
 Gerry Bellino, an alleged crime boss and one-time nightclub owner, named in the terms of reference for the Fitzgerald Inquiry, and accused of running several brothels and gambling dens in Fortitude Valley in the 1980s;
 Tanya Wilde, the first transgender political candidate in Australia, who ran on a gay rights platform opposing police violence against gay men in particular;
 Nigel Powell, a former undercover policeman in the Licensing Branch who helped spark the Fitzgerald Inquiry, running unofficially under a "Citizens Against Corruption Party" banner; and
 Isabella Ciadamidaro, an independent.

Results

Aftermath
The result was the first real indication of very serious problems for the National Party ahead of the 1989 election—with the collapse in their vote, the Liberals managed to win the seat against Labor on preferences. However, as a cross-bench party in the position of attacking an unpopular government while trying to avoid voters switching to the Labor opposition, and in some key seats dependent upon preference flows from National voters, some analysts suggested that if the government's support was to collapse completely in South East Queensland, Labor rather than the Liberals could become the key beneficiaries of the changing political tide. Mike Ahern, whose leadership of the Nationals was being questioned by conservatives within his party, survived as Premier of Queensland for another four months before being replaced by Russell Cooper. In December 1989, Labor under Wayne Goss won the election with 54 of the Assembly's 89 seats.

Santo Santoro served as the member for Merthyr and its successor seat, Clayfield, for 12 years until losing it at the 2001 election. He later served as a Federal Senator and a minister in the Howard Government.

See also
List of Queensland state by-elections

References 

1989 elections in Australia
Queensland state by-elections
1980s in Queensland